Tebey Solomon Ottoh (born October 14, 1983), known mononymously as Tebey, is a Canadian-American country music singer and multi-genre songwriter. His debut single, "We Shook Hands (Man to Man)", hit  47 on the Billboard Hot Country Songs charts and remains his only American chart hit.  He has composed several singles for other artists, in addition to releasing music of his own. Tebey has landed seven songs in the top ten of the Canada Country airplay chart, including the number one hit "Who's Gonna Love You" in 2018.

Early life
He started singing in church at the age of five and then began to sing at local events. In 1990 and again in 1994, he won the 14-and-under male division of the Canadian Open Country Singing Contest, and in 1996 and 1998, the 18-and-under male division. At 15, he signed a development deal with a major Nashville record label and moved to that city with his father, a Nigerian-born electronics engineer, with his mother and siblings staying back at their family home in Burlington, Ontario.

After three years, he and his father returned to Burlington. Ottoh was a high school football player at Assumption Catholic High School. But his Nashville career took a belated turn as Ottoh was signed to BNA Records as a singer and Warner Chappel Music as a staff songwriter in 2000.  Soon after, he signed fellow Canadian Bruce Allen as his manager.

Career
In 2002 and 2003, his performance of "We Shook Hands (Man to Man)" became a charted country radio hit in the United States and Canada. Tebey was the subject of a segment on CBC Radio's Sounds Like Canada, and nominated for a 2004 Canadian Radio Music Award for Best New Group or Solo Artist (Country), against Damian Marshall, Deric Ruttan, Heather Dawn and Jason Blaine.

Returning to Canada, Tebey became a professional songwriter in popular music outside of country.  Artists for whom he has written include Sony BMG recording artist Rex Goudie (including co-writing the No. 1 Hot AC single "Run"), Shawn Desman (including co-writing his No. 1 pop/r&b single "Let's Go"), 2006 Canadian Idol winner Melissa O'Neil, Open Road/Universal country Tara Oram and On Ramp/EMI artist Brad Johner.  Tebey also has a co-penned song on Big & Rich's million selling album Between Raising Hell and Amazing Grace" platinum.

As a country music artist Tebey has had several hit singles in Canada.  His songs "Somewhere In The Country" and "Till It's Gone" were Top 10 radio hits in 2012 and 2013 respectively.  In 2014, Tebey's country cover of Avicii's "Wake Me Up" reached No. 5 on the Canadian country music radio airplay chart and has sold in excess of 40,000 copies, being certified Canadian Gold. In 2014 Tebey became a member of the Warner Music Canada family, when he signed a record deal with Road Angel Entertainment, a sub label of the parent company.  Warner Music Canada currently handles the radio promotion and distribution of Tebey's music. In February 2018 Tebey released the first single from his upcoming EP. The video for "Denim on Denim" was directed by Emma Higgins and shot on location across Arizona, New Mexico and Texas.

In 2019, Tebey launched his own record label, Jayward Artist Group, with management executive Jill Snell. He signed himself and Quebecois country artist Matt Lang to the new label. His third album The Good Ones was released on the new label in January 2021. It includes the singles "Good Jeans", "Happened on a Saturday Night", "Shotgun Rider", "Song of the Summer", and the title track "The Good Ones", a duet with pop artist Marie-Mai.

In 2022, Tebey released "What Was I Drinking", the lead single off an upcoming album slated for a fall 2022 release titled Tulum''.

Songwriting
Currently signed to BMG Music Publishing in Los Angeles, Tebey has seen his songs recorded by various artists in both the country and pop music genres.  Notable pop artists to have recorded his songs include One Direction, Flo Rida, Fifth Harmony, Cher & The Veronicas. On April 16, 2017, Tebey scored his first Billboard Country No. 1 as a songwriter when his song "Somebody Else Will" became Justin Moore's eighth No. 1 song. He scored his first Canada Country No. 1 as a songwriter with Gord Bamford's "Dive Bar" in 2018.

In 2007, Tebey signed a worldwide co-publishing deal with Ole Media Management. He subsequently then moved to Nashville, Tennessee where he currently resides.  In 2008, Tebey has found himself traveling quite frequently to Stockholm Sweden, and Los Angeles to write for projects outside of the country music genre.  His recent co-writers include production team The Runners, Francci Richard, Location Songs, Kristian Lundin, and Lonny Bereal.

In 2009, Tebey co-wrote the Teairra Mari single featuring Flo Rida called "Cause A Scene".  The music video was shot in Las Vegas on April 7.  The album was released by Fo'Reel Ent/Warner Bros that summer. On September 11, 2011, Tebey scored his first-ever UK No. 1 single as a songwriter when his song "All About Tonight", recorded by Pixie Lott (Mercury Records), debuted at No. 1 with over 88,000 copies sold. On September 18, the song also topped the official UK Radio Airplay Chart, surpassing Maroon 5's "Moves Like Jagger".
The song was also nominated for Single of The Year at the 2012 Brit Awards.

In 2012, Tebey wrote and co-produced the One Direction songs "They Don't Know About Us" and "Loved You First" from their second album, "Take Me Home".

Discography

Studio albums

Extended plays

Singles

Christmas singles

Music videos

Awards and nominations

Notes

References

External links
 

1983 births
Living people
Canadian country singer-songwriters
21st-century Black Canadian male singers
Musicians from Peterborough, Ontario
Canadian male singer-songwriters
Canadian people of Nigerian descent